Panoz is an American manufacturer of sports automobiles founded in 1989 as Panoz Auto Development by Dan Panoz, son of Don Panoz. Panoz products have included the Panoz Roadster and AIV Roadster, the Panoz Esperante, and the Panoz Avezzano.

Panoz and racing

Since 1997, Panoz cars have competed in racing series around the world. Team Panoz Racing race the Panoz Avezzano in the Pirelli GTS class, and in 2018 won the Manufacturer's Championship. In addition to Le Mans series wins, an Esperante GTLM won the GT2 class at the 2006 24 Hours of Le Mans and in the same year, won the 2006 12 Hours of Sebring and was on the podium at the endurance season finale, 2006 Petit Le Mans. For the 2007 American Le Mans season, Panoz contracted longtime BMW Motorsport partner Prototype Technology Group to campaign the GTLM in the ALMS and Le Mans. Panoz has also provided IndyCar with the G-Force GF05 and GF09; and the Champ Car World Series with their final race car, the Panoz DP01 which was the final chassis used under ChampCar until the unification 
of the American open wheel series in road racing.

Road cars

Panoz (AIV) Roadster
Panoz Esperante
Panoz Esperante GT
Panoz Esperante GTLM
Panoz Esperante JRD (tuned By JRD)
Panoz Abruzzi 
Panoz Avezzano

Race cars
G-Force GF09
Panoz DP01
Panoz DP09
Panoz Esperante GTR-1
Panoz LMP-1 Roadster-S
Panoz LMP07
Panoz LMP01 Evo
Panoz Esperante GTS
Panoz Esperante GTLM (race version)
Panoz Abruzzi
Panoz Avezzano GT4

Panoz Motor Sports Group
Panoz Motor Sports Group was sold to NASCAR in 2012. The assets of the sale included the American Le Mans Series, Road Atlanta, Sebring International Raceway and Panoz Racing Schools. Mosport International Raceway was sold separately to a Canadian consortium led by Ron Fellows and Carlo Fidani.

Panoz, LLC., is an automotive manufacturer that builds and designs street cars and race cars. Élan Motorsports is a company that builds and designs race cars too. Both these two companies are still owned by the Panoz family.

American Le Mans Series

The American Le Mans Series (ALMS) was created by Don Panoz in 1999. Panoz also owned the International Motor Sports Association, the organization that sanctions the ALMS. It held its inaugural event, the 1998 Petit Le Mans as part of the Professional Sportscar Racing series.  The ALMS has a partnership with the Automobile Club de l'Ouest, the organizers of the 24 Hours of Le Mans, to allow teams to compete to the same regulations. In 2012, the ALMS was sold to NASCAR and then in 2014, the series merged with the Rolex Sports Car Series to form United SportsCar Racing.

Circuits
The Panoz group previously owned Road Atlanta in Braselton, Georgia, as well as previously operated Sebring International Raceway in Sebring, Florida. They also previously owned Mosport International Raceway in Bowmanville, Ontario, Canada but was sold in 2011.  The tracks hosted the American Le Mans Series, now the IMSA WeatherTech SportsCar Championship, in addition to other top-level auto and motorcycle racing series.

Élan Motorsport Technologies

Élan Motorsports is a company that designs and builds race cars from top-level professional racing cars, through to amateur race cars. The company is owned by the Panoz family.  Élan acquired other manufacturers, including famous Formula Ford builders Van Diemen and Indy Racing League constructor G-Force Technologies. Élan-built cars have raced in the Indy Racing League, Champ Car World Series, American Le Mans Series, Le Mans Series, and other championships.

Panoz Racing School and series

The Panoz Racing School was a driver training school previously operated at Road Atlanta and Sebring International Raceway.  Students learned racing techniques in purpose-built Panoz GT-RA cars.  Following completion of the course, students were eligible for an SCCA regional racing license.  The school also included programs where customers could receive instruction in their own road cars.

The Panoz Racing Series was a one-make series made up of the Panoz School cars, as well as the more powerful Panoz GTS models.  The series was designed for amateurs to learn racing in a low-cost environment.

References

External links
Panoz, LLC
Panoz Racing School
Panoz at the 24 hours of Le Mans
In-depth article about one man's experience at the Panoz Racing School, driving the Panoz GT-RA

Sports car manufacturers
Car manufacturers of the United States
American racecar constructors
Manufacturing companies based in Georgia (U.S. state)
Vehicle manufacturing companies established in 1989
Car brands